Besplemyanovsky is a rural locality (a khutor) in Dobrinskoye Rural Settlement, Uryupinsky District, Volgograd Oblast, Russia. The population was 249 as of 2010. There are 8 streets.

Geography 
Besplemyanovsky is located in forest steppe, 20 km southwest of Uryupinsk (the district's administrative centre) by road. Rzhavsky is the nearest rural locality.

References 

Rural localities in Uryupinsky District